Derrick Kabwe (born 29 October 1983) is a retired Zambian football striker.

References

1983 births
Living people
Zambian footballers
Zambia international footballers
Roan United F.C. players
ZESCO United F.C. players
Dynamos  F.C. players
Association football forwards
Zambian expatriate footballers
Expatriate footballers in Zimbabwe
Zambian expatriate sportspeople in Zimbabwe